The 1930 Newark Tornadoes season was their second and final in the National Football League. The team failed to improve on their previous output of 3–5–4, winning only one game. Playing eight games in October and losing 6, they finished eleventh in the league.

Schedule

Standings

References

Orange/Newark Tornadoes
Newark Tornadoes seasons
Newark Tornadoes
Newark Tornadoes